Kishore Lalchani (date of birth unknown) was a Ugandan-born Kenyan first-class cricketer.

A cricketer in Mombasa, he made a single appearance in first-class cricket for the Coast Cricket Association against a touring Pakistan International Airlines cricket team at Mombasa in 1964. Batting twice in the match, he was dismissed for 7 runs in the Coast Cricket Association first innings by Afaq Hussain, while in their second innings he was dismissed for 9 runs by Intikhab Alam. In Pakistan International Airlines only innings, he took the wickets of Abdur Rasheed, Asif Iqbal and Afaq Hussain for the cost of 45 runs.

References

External links

Ugandan emigrants to Kenya
Kenyan cricketers
Coast Cricket Association XI cricketers